Jiangning District is one of 11 districts of Nanjing, the capital of Jiangsu province, China. The District has a population of 1,025,000 and an area of 1600 square kilometers. It includes southern and south-eastern suburbs of Nanjing.

Jiangning Development Zone is located in this district. It has a population of 210,000. The Zone was approved on February 2, 1997, to be a national-level high and new technology industry development zone. In June 2001, the Zone won the ISO14001 environmental management system certificate. In June 2002, it won the title of the Jiangsu Provincial Base for Electronic and Information Industry. Approved Power automation industry base by National Science Ministry on October 30, 2004.

Name 
The name of Jiangning is meaning "peace in Jiangnan", the character "jiang" is meaning "river", especially meaning the Yangtze river; the character "ning" is meaning "peace". Jiangning was established in 280, and it was named Linjiang at that time. At the next year, it said that it was peaceful in Jiangnan, so changed the name Linjiang to Jiangning.

Historical sites
 Yangshan Quarry, with an unfinished giant stele from the reign of the Yongle Emperor. Tangshan Town.
 Chuning Tomb of Emperor Wu of Liu Song (ca. 422). Qilin Town
 Tomb of Zheng He

Transportation
 Nanjing Lukou International Airport

Administrative divisions 
Jiangning district has 10 subdistricts:

Education

British School of Nanjing is in Jiangning District.
Nanjing Jiangning Senior High School

References

External links 
Official website of Jiangning District
 

Districts of Nanjing